Sergio Román Sena (born 25 August 1982) is an Argentine football winger who plays for Gimnasia y Esgrima of the Torneo Argentino A.

Career
Sena started his playing career in 1996 with Talleres de Remedios de Escalada in the lower leagues of Argentine football.

In 2002, he was signed by Vélez Sársfield of the Argentine Primera in 2005 Sena was part of the squad that won the Clausura 2005 tournament. In 2007 Sena made his 100th league appearance for the club.

Honours
Vélez Sársfield
Argentine Primera División: 2005 Clausura
Arsenal
Argentine Primera División: 2012 Clausura

External links
 Argentine Primera statistics  
 Football-Lineups player profile

1982 births
Living people
Footballers from Buenos Aires
Argentine footballers
Association football midfielders
Talleres de Remedios de Escalada footballers
Club Atlético Vélez Sarsfield footballers
Arsenal de Sarandí footballers
Argentine Primera División players
Independiente Rivadavia footballers